A submission is a combat sports term for yielding to the opponent, and hence resulting in an immediate defeat. The submission – then also referred to as a "tap out" or "tapping out" – is often performed by visibly tapping the floor or the opponent with the hand or in some cases with the foot, or by saying the word "tap" to signal the opponent and/or the referee of the submission.  In some combative sports where the fighter has cornermen, the cornerman can also stop the fight by "throwing in the towel" (usually by literally throwing a towel into the ring), which may count as a submission.

Submissions are generally classified into one of two categories. The first are joint locks, which can include armbars, kimuras, americanas, anklelocks, kneebars, etc. The danger here is overextending the joint, so submitting protects the joint from damage. The next kind of submissions are chokeholds; these include rear naked chokes, guillotine choke, triangle choke, etc. The danger here is passing out due to lack of blood to the brain, so the fighter is forced to submit to retain consciousness.

Technical submission
A technical submission may occur when the referee stops the fight because a fighter has sustained an injury like a broken limb or is rendered unconscious while in a submission hold. An example would be a fighter's arm breaking in an armbar, or a fighter passing out in a choke hold. In both cases the fighter is unable to tap out, and an official decides that the fighter cannot safely continue to fight. Such a match outcome may be called a technical submission or a technical knockout (TKO) depending on the rules of combat used for the match. In UFC, a submission to strikes counts as a technical knockout.

See also

 Submission hold
 Submission wrestling
 Safeword (sports)

Martial arts terminology